Frederick Drew Gregory (born January 7, 1941) is a former United States Air Force pilot, military engineer, test pilot, and NASA astronaut as well as former NASA Deputy Administrator. He also served briefly as NASA Acting Administrator in early 2005, covering the period between the departure of Sean O'Keefe and the swearing in of Michael D. Griffin.

Early life and education
Frederick Gregory was born on January 7, 1941, in Washington, D.C.  His father was Francis A. Gregory, an educator who was assistant superintendent for D.C. Public Schools as well as the first Black president of the D.C. Public Library Board of Trustees. His father was given the honors of having the Francis A. Gregory Neighborhood Library named after him. His mother was Nora Drew Gregory, a lifelong educator as well as public library advocate. She was also the sister of noted African-American physician, surgeon and researcher Dr. Charles Drew, who developed improved techniques for blood storage, and applied his expert knowledge in developing large-scale blood banks early in World War II, saving thousands of Allied lives. Gregory's great-grandfather was educator James Monroe Gregory. His family lore suggests he has an ancestor from Madagascar.

Gregory was raised in Washington, D.C. and graduated from Anacostia High School. He attended the United States Air Force Academy after being nominated by Adam Clayton Powell Jr.; there, he received his Air Force commission and an undergraduate degree in military engineering.

Military career
After graduating from the Air Force Academy, Gregory earned his wings after helicopter school, flew in Vietnam, transitioned to fighter aircraft, attended the Navy Test Pilot School, and then conducted testing as an engineering test pilot for both the Air Force and NASA. He also received a master's degree in information systems from George Washington University.

During his time in the Air Force, Gregory logged approximately 7,000 hours in more than 50 types of aircraft as a helicopter, fighter and test pilot. He flew 550 combat rescue missions in Vietnam.

NASA career

 
Gregory was selected as an astronaut in January 1978. His technical assignments included: Astronaut Office representative at the Kennedy Space Center during initial Orbiter checkout and launch support for STS-1 and STS-2; Flight Data File Manager; lead spacecraft communicator (CAPCOM); Chief, Operational Safety, NASA Headquarters, Washington, D.C.; Chief, Astronaut Training; and a member of the Orbiter Configuration Control Board and the Space Shuttle Program Control Board. Notably, he was one of the CAPCOM during the Space Shuttle Challenger disaster.  A veteran of three Shuttle missions he has logged about 456 hours in space. He served as pilot on STS-51B (April 29 to May 6, 1985), and was the spacecraft commander on STS-33 (November 22–27, 1989), and STS-44 (November 24 to December 1, 1991).

STS-51B

STS-51B/Spacelab-3 launched from Kennedy Space Center, Florida, on April 29, 1985, with Gregory serving as pilot. The crew aboard the Orbiter Challenger included spacecraft commander, Robert Overmyer; mission specialists, Norman Thagard, William E. Thornton, and Don Lind; and payload specialists, Taylor Wang and Lodewijk van den Berg. On this second flight of the laboratory developed by the European Space Agency (ESA), the crew conducted a broad range of scientific experiments ranging from space physics to the suitability of animal-holding facilities. The crew also deployed the Northern Utah Satellite (NUSAT). After seven days of around-the-clock scientific operations, Challenger and its laboratory cargo landed on the dry lakebed at Edwards Air Force Base, California, on May 6, 1985. Mission duration was 168 hours, 8 minutes, 47 seconds.

STS-33

When STS-33 launched at night, from Kennedy Space Center, Florida, on November 22, 1989, Gregory became the first African-American to command a space flight.NASA - Diversity in Space On board the Orbiter Discovery, Gregory's crew included the pilot, John Blaha, and three mission specialists, Manley (Sonny) Carter, Story Musgrave, and Kathryn Thornton. The mission carried Department of Defense payloads and other secondary payloads. After 79 orbits of the Earth, this five-day mission concluded on November 27, 1989, with a hard surface landing on Runway 04 at Edwards AFB, California. Mission duration was 120 hours, 7 minutes, 32 seconds.

STS-44

STS-44 launched at night from the Kennedy Space Center, Florida, on November 24, 1991. During 110 orbits of the Earth, the crew successfully deployed their prime payload, the Defense Support Program (DSP) satellite. They worked on a variety of secondary payloads ranging from the Military Man in Space experiment designed to evaluate the ability of a space borne observer to gather information about ground troops, equipment and facilities, and also participated in extensive studies evaluating medical countermeasures to long duration space flight. The crew aboard the Orbiter Atlantis included the pilot Tom Henricks; three mission specialists, Story Musgrave, Jim Voss, and Mario Runco Jr.; and Army payload specialist Tom Hennen. The mission concluded on December 1, 1991, with a landing at Edwards Air Force Base in California. Mission duration was 166 hours, 50 minutes, 42 seconds.

NASA administration

Gregory served at NASA Headquarters as Associate Administrator for the Office of Safety and Mission Assurance (1992–2001), and was Associate Administrator for the Office of Space Flight (2001–2002). On August 12, 2002, Mr. Gregory was sworn in as NASA Deputy Administrator. In that role, he was responsible to the Administrator for providing overall leadership, planning, and policy direction for the Agency. The Deputy Administrator performs the duties and exercises the powers delegated by the Administrator, assists the Administrator in making final Agency decisions, and acts for the Administrator in his or her absence by performing all necessary functions to govern NASA operations and exercise the powers vested in the Agency by law. The Deputy Administrator articulates the Agency's vision and represents NASA to the Executive Office of the President, Congress, heads of Federal and other appropriate Government agencies, international organizations, and external organizations and communities. From the departure of Sean O'Keefe on February 20, 2005, to the swearing in of Michael D. Griffin on April 14, 2005, he was the NASA Acting Administrator. He returned to the post of Deputy Administrator and on September 9, 2005, submitted his resignation. He was replaced on November 29, 2005, by Shana Dale.

Personal life
Gregory was married to the former Barbara Archer of Washington, D.C. until her death in 2008. They had two grown children. Frederick, D. Jr., a Civil Servant working in the office of the Joint Chiefs of Staff (DOD), and a graduate of Stanford University and the University of Florida. Heather Lynn is a social worker and graduate of Sweet Briar College and the University of Maryland. He is now married to the former Annette Becke of Washington, D.C. and together they have three children and six grandchildren. His recreational interests include reading, boating, hiking, diving, biking and traveling.

Education
1958: Graduated from Anacostia High School, Washington, D.C.
1964: Received a Bachelor of Science degree from the United States Air Force Academy
1977: Received a master's degree in information systems from George Washington University

Organizations
Mr. Gregory is a member of the following organizations:
Order of Daedalians
The Air Force Association
The Tuskegee Airmen, Inc
United States Air Force Academy Endowment board member
United States Air Force Association of Graduates board member
Omega Psi Phi fraternity
Sigma Pi Phi fraternity
Society of Experimental Test Pilots
American Helicopter Society
National Aviation Hall of Fame board member
National Museum of the Air Force trustee
Chairman of the NASA Alumni League
National Technical Association
Association of Space Explorers officer
Astronaut Scholarship Foundation board member

Special honors
Mr. Gregory holds the following honors and awards:
Air Force Legion of Merit
Defense Superior Service Medal
Distinguished Flying Cross – 3
Defense Meritorious Service Medal
Air Force Meritorious Service Medal
Air Medal - 16
Air Force Commendation Medal
NASA Distinguished Service Medal - 2
NASA Spaceflight Medal – 3
NASA Outstanding Leadership Award - 2
National Intelligence Medal
Astronaut Hall of Fame
National Society of Black Engineers Distinguished Scientist Award
Designated an "Ira Eaker Fellow" by the Air Force Association
Presidential Rank Award
United States Air Force Academy Distinguished Graduate
The George Washington University Distinguished Graduate
Anacostia High School Hall of Fame
Honorary Doctorates from: The University of the District of Columbia, Southwestern University, The College of Aeronautics 
The Charles R. Drew University of Medicine and Science President's Medal
The Consolidated Education and Training Facility at the United States Air Force Academy was renamed “Gregory Hall” in September 2021 in honor of Frederick Gregory

See also

 List of African-American astronauts

References

1941 births
Living people
American people of Malagasy descent
Aviators from Washington, D.C.
Deputy Administrators of NASA
United States Air Force Academy alumni
United States Air Force colonels
United States Air Force personnel of the Vietnam War
Military personnel from Washington, D.C.
Recipients of the Distinguished Flying Cross (United States)
George Washington University alumni
United States Astronaut Hall of Fame inductees
Recipients of the Defense Superior Service Medal
United States Air Force astronauts
American astronaut-politicians
Space Shuttle program astronauts
People from Southeast (Washington, D.C.)
George W. Bush administration personnel